Tanner Hall may refer to:
 Tanner Hall (film), a 2009 drama film
 Tanner Hall (skier), American freeskier
 Tanner Hall (baseball), American college baseball pitcher